The Han Kitab are a collection of Chinese Islamic texts, written by Chinese Muslims, which synthesise Islam and Confucianism. Their name reflects this synthesis: Han is the Chinese word for Chinese and kitab means book in Arabic. They were written in the early 18th century during the Qing dynasty by various Chinese Muslim authors. The Han Kitab were widely read and approved of by later Chinese Muslims such as Ma Qixi, Ma Fuxiang, and Hu Songshan.

History 
The origins of Han Kitab literature can be traced back to the establishment of the scripture hall education (jingtang jiaoyu) system created by scholar Hu Dengzhou in the 16th century. After studying abroad in the Islamic world for years, Hu returned to China and formed the educational system, which incorporated the use of authoritative Islamic texts and foreign language lessons mixed with Chinese. Initially the Han Kitab was composed of Chinese translations of Sufi texts originally written in Persian. Around the mid-17th century, Chinese Muslim scholars began writing original texts that synthesized Islamic and Classical Chinese thought. Within a few generations, the instructional system spread throughout China, and subsequent scholars began writing Islamic literature within a Chinese cultural context.

Authorship 
Liu Zhi wrote his Han Kitab in Nanjing in the early 18th century. The works of Wu Zunqie, Zhang Zhong, and Wang Daiyu were also included in the Han Kitab.

References

Bibliography 

 
 

Sunni literature
Islamic literature
Confucian texts
Chinese philosophy
Chinese classic texts
Chinese literature
18th-century books
Islam in China
Religious syncretism